Alberton railway station is located on the Outer Harbor line. Situated in the north-western Adelaide suburb of Alberton, it is 10.2 kilometres from Adelaide station. The station is registered as a South Australian Heritage.

History
The railway station and the substantial brick and stone building on the northbound platform were constructed in 1856 when the line between Adelaide and Port Adelaide was built. The other intermediate stations on this line were at Bowden and Woodville. In the early days, Adelaide to Port Adelaide was a single-track railway. As traffic on the line increased, a second platform opened at Alberton in 1878 and the single track was duplicated throughout in 1881. Goods sidings were installed in 1892, controlled by a signal cabin adjacent to the Fussell Place level crossing.

As traffic declined in the second half of the 20th century, the goods siding and signal cabin were taken out of use in 1953. Alberton station has been unattended since 1 September 1987, but the building on the first platform is now used as a hairdresser. In late 2016, the station was ranked as one of the worst stations in the western suburbs based on 5 criteria. On 17 May 2022, a 62 year old woman was fatally struck by a train at a crossing north of the station, causing the line to be closed for several hours and promoting calls for more gates at crossings along the Outer Harbor line.

No freight trains operate through Alberton, however a significant amount of freight traffic used the nearby Rosewater loop until 2008 when the Mary MacKillop Bridge over the Port River was opened. The Rosewater loop joined the Adelaide to Outer Harbor line at Port Adelaide Junction (just north of Alberton) heading for the Lefevre Peninsula and Pelican Point.

Services by platform

References

Rails Through Swamp and Sand - A History of the Port Adelaide Railway M. Thompson, pub. Port Dock Station Railway Museum (1988)

External links

Track map

Railway stations in Adelaide
Railway stations in Australia opened in 1856
South Australian Heritage Register